The Prince and the Pauper is a 1990 American animated comedy action-adventure featurette produced by Walt Disney Feature Animation and directed by George Scribner. Featuring the voice of Wayne Allwine as Mickey Mouse, it is inspired by Mark Twain's 1881 novel of the same name. It was Disney's final use of the traditional ink-and-paint and camera process, before the CAPS digital-ink-and-paint process rendered the traditional techniques and equipment obsolete. Some objects, such as the carriage, were created on computers before being printed out on paper and photocopied onto animation cels.

The film was released on November 16, 1990, as the first animated short produced by Disney to accompany the original release of a Disney animated feature, accompanying the original release of Walt Disney Feature Animation's 29th animated feature film The Rescuers Down Under, a sequel to the 1977 animated film, The Rescuers.

Plot
The story begins in England when a king ruled the country with peace and compassion. However, one day, the good king has fallen ill, and his greedy captain of the guard Pete plunders and terrorizes the country in the king's name. Mickey Mouse, Goofy, and Pluto are three beggars, trying to get money for some food when Captain Pete's carriage, filled with stolen food, passes. Pluto sees a sausage stand out from the carriage and gives chase, pursuing it into the castle. When Mickey knocks on the door to get his dog back, one of the soldiers opens the door and lets him in, mistaking him for the prince. Pete lectures the soldier for letting anyone in, pointing out where the real prince is: in class with his teacher Horace Horsecollar and his valet Donald Duck. The prince hears Pete outside, roughly handling Mickey and Pluto. The prince orders them to be brought to him right away. Pete kicks Mickey through the door and forces Pluto out of the castle.

While in the palace, Mickey meets the prince and they both realize that they are entirely identical in appearance. The prince tells the beggar that he is bored with his life and convinces the beggar to exchange clothes and roles with each other. The prince reassures the beggar that everything will be fine, and if there are any problems, everyone will recognize the true prince with his real ring. Disguised as a beggar, the prince tricks Pete into kicking him out of the palace and meets Goofy and Pluto while Mickey is challenged with the prince's studies. The prince witnesses a couple of soldiers trying to steal a chicken from Clarabelle Cow and her two children. The children explain that for years the soldiers have taken away their food and belongings in the name of the king. When a carriage with the stolen food goes by, the prince stops it by identifying himself through the ring and he returns the food to the people. The soldiers attempt to stop the prince, thinking that he is an impostor, but fail when he escapes with help from the villagers and Goofy. One of the soldiers tells Pete that one of the beggars had the royal ring.

Pete is alarmed realizing that he cast out the real prince and that he may see the corruption and theft going on outside. As such, Pete plans to execute the prince and take control of the kingdom for himself by using Mickey as a puppet ruler. Mickey, still dressed as the prince, is called to see his father, who is now dying. Mickey enters the room of the dying king and the king tells him he must take his royal birthright and become king. Mickey decides to find and inform the prince as quickly as possible, but Pete arrives and blackmails Mickey to be crowned king by threatening to kill a captured Pluto. Meanwhile, the true prince hears the bells announcing the death of his father and realizes that he must return immediately to the palace. Pete captures the prince and detains him with Donald (whose reasons for imprisonment are unknown), while the coronation begins. Goofy disguises himself as an executioner, and after accidentally knocking out the guard, the three escape the cell and run to the coronation chamber. While Mickey tries to postpone being crowned by the archbishop, the prince arrives and fights Pete, who becomes entangled with his soldiers in a fallen chandelier, and they fall out of a window. Mickey and the prince then cheer in their success in defeating Captain Pete and his men. However, the archbishop is still confused and does not know whom to crown until Pluto recognizes Mickey. The real prince is crowned King of England, and he happily appoints Mickey and Goofy as members of his royal court while ruling for many years with justice and compassion for all.

Voice cast
 Wayne Allwine as Mickey Mouse and the Prince
 Arthur Burghardt as Captain Pete
 Tony Anselmo as Donald Duck
 Bill Farmer as Goofy, Pluto, Horace Horsecollar and Weasel #1
 Elvia Allman as Clarabelle Cow
 Charlie Adler as Weasel #2 & 3 , Pig Driver, Peasant and Man in Street
 Frank Welker as the King and Archbishop
 Trevor Eyster as Kid #1
 Rocky Krakoff as Kid #2
 Roy Dotrice as the Narrator

Home media

VHS/LaserDisc
The short was released on VHS several times. The VHS and LaserDisc counterparts were first released in June 1991 as part of the Walt Disney Mini-Classics line. In January 1994, the Disney Favorite Stories line was introduced a couple of months after the discontinuation of the Mini-Classics line and that same date, "The Prince and the Pauper" was one of the first few Disney short films re-issued as part of it.

DVD
The short was later released on May 18, 2004 on Walt Disney Treasures: Mickey Mouse in Living Color, Volume Two: 1939-Today.

See also
 Mickey Mouse (film series)

References

External links
 
 

1990 short films
1990 animated films
Walt Disney Pictures films
1990s Disney animated short films
Prince and the Pauper 1990
Prince and the Pauper 1990
Animated films set in England
Animated films about mice
Films set in palaces
Prince and the Pauper 1990
Films directed by George Scribner
Films scored by Nicholas Pike
American animated featurettes
1990s English-language films
Films about princes